Brezina is a village and municipality in the Trebišov District in the Košice Region of eastern Slovakia.

History 
In historical records the village was first mentioned in 1300.

Geography 
The village lies at an altitude of 186 metres and covers an area of 12.964 km².
It has a population of about 715 people.

Demography 

The village is about 88% Slovak.

Development of the population from 1850 to present

Facilities 
The village has a public library and a football pitch.

Genealogical resources 

The records for genealogical research are available at the state archive "Statny Archiv in Kosice, Slovakia"

 Roman Catholic church records (births/marriages/deaths): 1774-1900 (parish B)
 Greek Catholic church records (births/marriages/deaths): 1826-1897 (parish A)
 Reformated church records (births/marriages/deaths): 1773-1897 (parish A)

See also 
 List of municipalities and towns in Slovakia

External links 
 https://web.archive.org/web/20070513023228/http://www.statistics.sk/mosmis/eng/run.html
 Surnames of living people in Brezina

Villages and municipalities in Trebišov District